Big Fun is an album by the American blues musician Elvin Bishop, released by the Alligator label in 1988.

Reception

AllMusic reviewer William Ruhlmann stated that "this record, which, naturally, emphasizes his more blues-oriented guitar playing, although without sacrificing his country boy identity". The Penguin Guide to Blues Recordings wrote: "These albums have a quality rarely encountered in records of their type - personality. Much of that is down to the garrulity of Bishop's singing and his quirky angular guitar solos ... If the albums have fault , it's Bishop's inclination to indulge in his own form of blues-rap ... it's pleasant enough but it's an easy way out".

Track listing
All compositions by Elvin Bishop except where noted
 "Don't You Lie to Me" (Hudson Whittaker) − 3:25
 "Beer Drinking Woman" (Peter Chatman) − 4:12
 "Oklahoma Country Girl" − 2:47
 "My Dog" (William Schuler) − 3:33
 "Midnight Hour Blues" (Leroy Carr) − 3:31
 "No Broken Hearts" − 2:50
 "The Right String But the Wrong Yo-Yo" (Willie Perryman) − 2:35
 "She Puts Me in the Mood" − 3:32
 "Country Boy" − 3:01
 "Honest I Do" (Jimmy Reed) − 3:01
 "Fishin' Again" − 3:25

Personnel
Elvin Bishop − guitar, vocals
Stevie Gurr − guitar, harmonica, backing vocals
Nancy Wright, Terry Hanck − tenor saxophone
Reynaldo "Daddy Ray" Arvizu Jr. − alto saxophone
Phil Aaberg, Mac "Dr. John" Rebennack − keyboards
Michael "Fly" Brooks − bass
Norton Buffalo − guitar, harmonica
Gary Silva – drums, backing vocals
Kathy Kennedy, Katie Guthorn – drums, backing vocals
The Carptones, Whit Lehnberg – general mayhem (track 11)

References

Alligator Records albums
1988 albums
Elvin Bishop albums